The Doñana Disaster, also known as the Aznalcollar Disaster or Guadiamar Disaster (Sp: Desastre de Aznalcóllar, Desastre del Guadiamar), was an industrial accident in Andalusia, southern Spain. On 25 April 1998, a holding dam burst at the Los Frailes mine, near Aznalcóllar, Seville Province, releasing 4–5 million cubic metres of mine tailings. The acidic tailings, which contained dangerous levels of several heavy metals, quickly reached the nearby River Agrio, and then its affluent the River Guadiamar, travelling about 40 kilometres along these waterways before they could be stopped. The Guadiamar is the main water source for the Doñana National Park, a UNESCO World Heritage Site and one of the largest national parks in Europe. The cleanup operation took three years, at an estimated cost of €240 million.

The Los Frailes mine is owned by Boliden-Apirsa (formerly Andaluza de Piritas, S.A.), the Spanish subsidiary of Boliden, and produces about 125,000 tonnes of zinc and 2.9 million ounces (about 3,500 metric tonnes) of silver per year.

History 
The park is one of Europe’s best known conservation areas and has been designated a UNESCO biosphere reserve, a Ramsar Wetland Site, and a UNESCO World Heritage site. The park’s past includes a well-chronicled human history stretching back 700 years. In its first year of operation in 1997, Boliden Ltd produced 180,000 tonnes of zinc, lead, copper and silver from 4 million tonnes of ore.

National Park 
Doñana National Park, just east of Portugal, is located between two provinces of Andalucia, Seville and Huelva. It is notable for the great diversity of its biotopes, especially lagoons, marshlands, fixed and mobile dunes, scrub woodland and maquis. As one of the continent's biggest natural reserves, Doñana is also host of a large variety of bird species. Because of its location and close proximity between Africa and Europe, more than half a million birds winter in the park each year, and perhaps half of Europe’s bird species can be spotted here at one time or another.

Environmental effects 

As a result of the ecological disaster, nothing survived because of the high acidity of the waste, which contained a mixture of lead, copper, zinc, cadmium and other metals, along with sulphides. The industrial disaster led to a chain of serious environmental issues in the Andalusia region. A not very visible toxic chain spread through the nature which was difficult to break down. High levels of heavy metals are still embedded in soil and water and have found a way into the wildlife. Another major problem lies in the health of the animals that lived around the park. In this mixture of swamps and woodlands, 300 species of birds breed, feed or stop over on their migratory route between Northern Europe and Africa. This migration soon came to an end when the dam exploded; almost 2,000 birds, chicks, eggs, and nests were killed or destroyed and more than 25,000 kilos of dead fish were collected in the aftermath.

Economic consequences 
The mine, owned by Boliden Ltd. of Sweden, has spent more than $52 million cleaning up, repairing damage and 
reimbursing farmers for lost crops. Most of the cleaning that was done by the clean up crews was dumped into a large ditch that was empty. As a result, most of the area that was affected is now new and clean. This was the country's worst environmental disaster. The cleanup cost as of 2002 was reported to be €276. In 2014, The Guardian reported that Spain had decided to further (?) spend €360 million on restoring the landscape.

Projects 
Although the Doñana Disaster turned out to be one of the worst catastrophes in Europe, there have been speculations about reopening the long gone mine. One reason for the suggestion is that the area is a home for thousands of birds that migrate from different continents. The main cause as to why supporters have been talking about reopening the mine is for the economic reason that there are riches in the land. Reopening the mine would provide 1,000 jobs. The process would not be as easy to accomplish, as skeptics suggests reopening the mine would lead to a consecutive burst. Nonetheless, the secretary-general for Innovation, Industry and Energy of Andalucía, Vicente Guerrero, explained that the mine license would stipulate only modern mining techniques would be allowed. The Spaniard also included that no liquid would be used under the exercise of the best technology in the world, which would avoid the creation of poisonous wet tailing.

See also 
 Baia Mare cyanide spill (2000)
 Health crisis
 Val di Stava dam collapse (1985)
 Ajka alumina plant accident (2010)

References

External links
Pesoe The Los Frailes tailings dam failure (Aznalcóllar, Spain) from the World Information Service on Energy

Environmental disasters in Europe
Mining disasters in Spain
Environmental issues in Spain
Pollution in Spain
History of the province of Seville
Iberian Pyritic Belt
Waste disposal incidents
1998 mining disasters
1998 in Spain
1998 in the environment
Tailings dam failures
April 1998 events in Europe
Dam failures in Europe
1998 disasters in Spain